José Luis Velasco Lino (born 22 April 1963) is a Mexican politician from the Institutional Revolutionary Party. From 2009 to 2012 he served as Deputy of the LXI Legislature of the Mexican Congress representing the State of Mexico.

References

1963 births
Living people
People from Toluca
Institutional Revolutionary Party politicians
21st-century Mexican politicians
Deputies of the LXI Legislature of Mexico
Members of the Chamber of Deputies (Mexico) for the State of Mexico